Područna fudbalska liga Novi Sad, commonly known as PFL Novi Sad, is a section of the District Leagues, Serbia's fifth football league. The league is operated by the Football Association of the City of Novi Sad.

PFL Novi Sad consists of 16 clubs from South Bačka District  who play each other in a double round-robin league, with each club playing the other club home and away. At the end of the season the top club will be promoted to Novi Sad-Syrmia Zone League.

Champions history

See also
Serbian SuperLiga
Serbian First League
Serbian League
Vojvodina League West
Serbian Zone League
Novi Sad Football League

External links
 Official website
 Results and Table „PFL Novi Sad“ www.srbijasport.net

5
Football in Vojvodina
Sport in Novi Sad